Little Snitch is a host-based application firewall for macOS. It can be used to monitor applications, preventing or permitting them to connect to attached networks through advanced rules. It is produced and maintained by the Austrian firm Objective Development Software GmbH.

Unlike a stateful firewall, which is designed primarily to protect a system from external attacks by restricting inbound traffic, Little Snitch is designed to protect privacy by limiting outbound traffic. Until Little Snitch 4, it controled network traffic by registering kernel extensions through the standard application programming interface (API) provided by Apple, but for its 5th release it switched to using Apple's Network Extensions due to the deprecationof Kernel Extensions on macOS Catalina.

If an application or process attempts to establish a network connection, Little Snitch prevents the connection, if a rule for that connection has been set by the user. For that, a dialog is presented to the user, which allows one to deny or permit the connection on a one-time, time limited, or permanent basis. The dialog also allows the user to restrict the parameters of the connection, restricting it to a specific port, protocol, or domain. Little Snitch's integral network monitor shows ongoing traffic in real time with domain names and traffic direction displayed.

The application (version 4) received a positive 4.5/5 review from Macworld.

References

External links
 

Firewall software